Dinamani is a Tamil daily newspaper. The newspaper was established in 1933 and is owned by The New Indian Express Group. The first edition was published on 11 September. The printed circulation will be 1,244,568 as on Aug 2022 and 11,52,546 online subscribers. It is printed and published from Bangalore, Chennai, Coimbatore, Dharmapuri, Madurai, New Delhi, Tirunelveli, Tiruchirappalli, Vellore and Villupuram.

Dinamani Kathir 
Dinamani Kathir is a magazine owned by Dinamani.

See also
A N Sivaraman, past editor
RmT Sambandham, past editor
K Vaidhiyanathan, Editor

References

External links
Dinamani website
Dinamani ePaper

Mass media in Chennai
Tamil-language newspapers published in India
Mass media in Coimbatore
Mass media in Madurai
Newspapers published in Tiruchirappalli
1934 establishments in India